Solaristics is the second studio album by Thessalonians, released in May 2005 by Noh Poetry Records. The album comprises recording sessions that were completed between 1992 and 1996.

Reception
Backroad Music called Solaristics "a great lost recording" and noted the lead track "Solaristics" as being a highlight of the sessions. Stefaan Van Ryssen of Leonardo On-Line gave the album a mixed review, stating that composers Kim Cascone and Larry Thrasher have created higher quality work elsewhere but noting that "each piece brings its own atmosphere, ranging from pensive to thoughtful, or from melancholy to gloomy." The critic went on to conclude that the album is an "interesting release for historic reasons but very dated for contemporary ears."

Track listing

Personnel
Adapted from the Solaristics liner notes.

Thessalonians
 Kim Cascone – instruments, production
 Don Falcone – instruments
 Paul Neyrinck – instruments
 Larry Thrasher – instruments

Additional credits
 Karen Anderson – graphic design

Release history

References

External links 
 Solaristics at Bandcamp
 Solaristics at iTunes
 

2005 albums
Thessalonians (band) albums